Artyom Alekseyevich Zdunov (born 18 May 1978), is a Russian statesman and politician, who is currently the 3rd Head of the Republic of Mordovia since 29 September 2021.

Biography
Artyom Zdunov was born in Kazan on 18 May 1978 of Erzyan ethnicity.

From 1996 to 1998, he was deputy chairman of the trade union committee of students of Kazan Institute of Finance and Economics (KFEI).

In 2000, he graduated from the KFEI, and in the same place in 2004 in graduate school. He has PhD in Economics since 2005.

From June 2000 to March 2001, he was an insurance specialist, an internal auditor of the Open Joint Stock Insurance Company Industrial Insurance Company.

From April 2004 to July 2006 he taught at the Department of Macroeconomics and Economic Theory of the KFEI.

From July 2006 to May 2010, he held the position of deputy director for Science of the State Institution "Center for Advanced Economic Research of the Academy of Sciences of the Republic of Tatarstan".

Since May 2010, Zdunov was Deputy Minister of Economy of the Republic of Tatarstan.

From 14 October 2014 to 6 February 2018, Zdunov was the Minister of Economy of the Republic of Tatarstan.

On 6 February 2018, the interim head of Dagestan, Vladimir Vasilyev, submitted the candidacy of Zdunov for the post of chairman of the republic's government to parliament. On 7 February 2018, the parliament of Dagestan approved his candidacy.

On 18 November 2020, Zdunov was appointed acting Head of the Republic of Mordovia.

In September 2021, Zdunov was elected the 3rd Head of Republic of Mordovia.

Family
Artyom Zdunov is Erzyan by ethnicity.  He is married to a Tatar woman and has a son and a daughter.

Income and property
The amount of declared income for 2019 amounted to 7 million 835 thousand rubles. His wife has 578 thousand rubles.

References

1978 births
Living people
United Russia politicians
Heads of the Republic of Mordovia